The 1934 Tour de France was the 28th edition of Tour de France, one of cycling's Grand Tours. The Tour began in Paris with a flat stage on 3 July, and Stage 13 occurred on 17 July with a flat stage from Marseille. The race finished in Paris on 29 July.

Stage 13
17 July 1934 — Marseille to Montpellier,

Stage 14
18 July 1934 — Montpellier to Perpignan,

Stage 15
20 July 1934 — Perpignan to Ax-les-Thermes,

Stage 16
21 July 1934 — Ax-les-Thermes to Luchon,

Stage 17
22 July 1934 — Luchon to Tarbes,

Stage 18
23 July 1934 — Tarbes to Pau,

Stage 19
25 July 1934 — Pau to Bordeaux,

Stage 20
26 July 1934 — Bordeaux to La Rochelle,

Stage 21a
27 July 1934 — La Rochelle to La Roche-sur-Yon,

Stage 21b
27 July 1934 — La Roche-sur-Yon to Nantes,  (ITT)

Stage 22
28 July 1934 — Nantes to Caen,

Stage 23
29 July 1934 — Caen to Paris,

References

 Stage 13
1934,13